Nizhny Kuranakh (Allaraa Kuraanax) is an urban locality (an urban-type settlement) in Aldansky District of the Sakha Republic, Russia, located  from Aldan, the administrative center of the district. As of the 2010 Census, its population was 5,901.

History
It was first settled in the 1920s, when gold was discovered and mining activities began. It was granted urban-type settlement status in 1950.

Administrative and municipal status
Within the framework of administrative divisions, the urban-type settlement of Nizhny Kuranakh, together with two rural localities, is incorporated within Aldansky District as the Settlement of Nizhny Kuranakh. As a municipal division, the Settlement of Nizhny Kuranakh is incorporated within Aldansky Municipal District as Nizhny Kuranakh Urban Settlement.

Economy
Nizhny Kuranakh is located on the Amur–Yakutsk Mainline, between the towns of Aldan and Tommot. Employment is centered mainly on the nearby open-cut gold mine. Mining company Aldanzoloto maintains its head offices in Nizhny Kuranakh and employs about 80% of its workforce.

References

Notes

Sources
Official website of the Sakha Republic. Registry of the Administrative-Territorial Divisions of the Sakha Republic. Aldansky District. 

Urban-type settlements in the Sakha Republic